Raffaele Licinio (1 February 1945 - 4 February 2018) was an Italian historian, who, throughout his career, carried out extensive research into the medieval period in Southern Italy (the Kingdom of Sicily). He also taught medieval history at the University of Bari (Bari, Italy).

He's best known for his research on the Kingdom of Sicily during the rule of king Frederick II of Hohenstaufen and the castle Castel del Monte. His research focused mainly on the socioeconomic structure, the economic and agrarian development, the medieval fortification system and the institutions of Southern Italy in the Middle Ages. He also translated some French works into Italian.

In his works (especially in Castel del Monte e il sistema castellare nella Puglia di Federico II), he also condemned the widespread esoteric views and interpretations on both the castle Castel del Monte and the king Frederick II himself, spread even by notable scholars and historians. In particular, Licinio stressed that Castel del Monte was just one of the castles of the regional fortification system, and not a mysterious construction linked to the Knights Templar.

Life 
Raffaele Licinio was born in 1945 in Ceglie del Campo, a district of the Italian city Bari, Apulia. He studied literature and philosophy at the University of Bari, where one of his professors was Giosuè Musca. In the same university, he graduated in 1970 ca. with the highest score, while in 1974 he was appointed university assistant in the subject of medieval history. In 1985, he was appointed professor of "medieval institutions" at the University of Bari, while in 1999 he became professor of medieval history in the same university. He was also appointed professor of medieval history at the University of Foggia, teaching in the same university from 2001 until 2007.

Since his youth, he was also actively involved in politics; he started joining some leftist non-parliamentary groups, and later he joined the Partito Comunista Italiano (the Italian Communist Party). His testimony also helped to identify the murderer of Benedetto Petrone, who had been stabbed to death in Bari on November 28, 1977, by a gang of neo-fascists.

Career 
 Professor of medieval history at the University of Bari
 Professor of medieval history at the University of Foggia (2001-2007)
 Head of the Centro di studi normanno-svevi at the University of Bari (2002-)
 Manager of the two-year international meetings Giornate normanno-sveve (2004-2010)
 Founder and director of the Scuola-Laboratorio di Medievistica di Troia (1995-1998)

Works

Books

Publications

Foreword

Appendix

Translated books

Works related to Raffaele Licinio

References

External links 
 ArcheoBarletta - Raffaele Licinio - Pubblicazioni
 Stupormundi.it - Licinio Raffaele
 Corriere del Mezzogiorno - Addio Licinio, maestro di Medioevo
 L'omaggio del Centro ricerche al professor Raffaele Licinio
 Michele Laforgia ricorda Raffaele Licinio
 Chapeau, caro professor Licinio

20th-century Italian historians
20th-century Italian male writers
1945 births
2018 deaths
People from Bari
Translators to Italian
Translators from French
Italian communists
Academic staff of the University of Bari
21st-century Italian writers
Historians of Italy
21st-century Italian historians
University of Bari alumni
Italian translators